Healy Chapel is a historic mortuary in Aurora, Illinois. It was designed by George Grant Elmslie and is one of only a few Prairie School buildings designed for commercial purposes.

History
William H. Healy moved from Yorkville, Illinois to Aurora in 1891. He opened "Healy and Blair", a furniture store that doubled as a mortuary. His brother, Arthur N. Healy, joined him in a new partnership in 1901 and they moved into a new building at 50 W Downer Place. Focusing almost exclusively on undertaking, the firm was officially incorporated in 1919. Increased demand for their services led to the need for a new building.

The Healy Chapel is one of only a few commercial buildings built in the Prairie School style. It was designed by George Grant Elmslie, a  renowned architect who worked with Louis Sullivan. Like most Prairie School buildings, there is a strong emphasis on horizontal designs on the exterior. The three-story building features beige stucco along the third floor. A line of orange-glazed terracotta separates the stucco from the brick lower levels.

The building was constructed down the street from the old practice, at 332 W. Downer Place, and cost $100,000. The Healys were the first to bring hearse service to Aurora, and the Healy Chapel is recognized as the first building in the state exclusively used as a mortuary. It is located in the West Side Historic District, but is listed as a non-contributing property. It remains family-owned and continues to operate.

External links
Healy Chapel website

References

Buildings and structures in Aurora, Illinois
National Register of Historic Places in Kane County, Illinois
Commercial buildings on the National Register of Historic Places in Illinois